Harare Sports Club is a sports club and the Harare Sports Club Ground is a cricket stadium in Harare, Zimbabwe. Founded in 1900 and known as Salisbury Sports Club until 1982, it is mostly used for cricket matches, and has served as the primary cricket venue in Rhodesia and Zimbabwe since its foundation. Other sports played at the club are rugby, tennis, golf and squash.

History
The earliest recorded first-class cricket match at Salisbury Sports Club was played in 1910. In the years between World War II and independence from the United Kingdom, the ground hosted several of Rhodesia's home matches in the Currie Cup, South Africa's main domestic first-class competition.

The first List A match at the ground was played in September 1980, shortly after independence. During the 1980s and early 1990s, the ground frequently hosted first-class and List A matches between the Zimbabwe national team and touring national 'A', 'B' and youth teams.

In July 1992, Zimbabwe became a full member of the International Cricket Council (ICC), thus obtaining Test status. Three months later, Harare Sports Club hosted the country's inaugural Test match, against India. Soon after, the ground played host to its first One Day International, also against India. In February 1995, HSC was the site of Zimbabwe's first-ever Test win, against Pakistan.

The venue

The ground is surrounded by Jacaranda trees and with a beautiful gabled pavilion, Harare Sports Club is in the heart of the city. It is bordered by the heavily guarded presidential palace on one side and the prestigious Royal Harare Golf Club on another.

The venue hosted Zimbabwe's first Test in October 1992 and has been the country's major Test and one-day venue since. Although the club itself does not possess any of the major stands associated with major sports grounds, the capacity of around 10,000 can be increased by the use of temporary stands a record crowd of 26,000 saw Rhodesia play the MCC in 1956.

However, that capacity is rarely tested and in recent times only the 2014 Zimbabwe Tri-Series, involving Australia and South Africa, and the 2018 Cricket World Cup Qualifier have drawn sizeable crowds. The main social centre is the historic pavilion with its popular bar, The Centurion. On the southern side of the ground is Castle Corner, the alternative and usually lively bar.

This ground is home to the domestic team Mashonaland Eagles. Harare Sports Club is also home to the Zimbabwe Cricket Union, the country's national cricket board.

See also
List of Test cricket grounds
List of international cricket centuries at the Harare Sports Club
 List of international cricket five-wicket hauls at Harare Sports Club

References

External links
 
 Profile by Cricinfo
 Profile by HSCRugby

Cricket grounds in Zimbabwe
Sport in Harare
2003 Cricket World Cup stadiums
Buildings and structures in Harare
Test cricket grounds in Zimbabwe
Sports venues completed in 1909